Flanvotumab, also known as IMC-20D7S, is a human monoclonal antibody designed for the treatment of melanoma. It targets TYRP1.

Flanvotumab was developed by ImClone Systems, now owned by Eli Lilly.

References 

Monoclonal antibodies
Abandoned drugs